Carboxynorspermidine synthase (carboxynorspermidine dehydrogenase, carboxyspermidine dehydrogenase, CASDH, CANSDH) is an enzyme with systematic name carboxynorspermidine:NADP+ oxidoreductase. This enzyme catalyses the following chemical reactions

 (1) carboxynorspermidine + H2O + NADP+  L-aspartate 4-semialdehyde + propane-1,3-diamine + NADPH + H+
 (2) carboxyspermidine + H2O + NADP+  L-aspartate 4-semialdehyde + putrescine + NADPH + H+

The reaction takes place in the opposite direction.

References

External links 
 

EC 1.5.1